"Here Alone" is Beni Arashiro's third single, which served as the outro theme for the TV ASAHI 45th Anniversary Special Drama, Kiyoharu Matsumoto’s "Kurokawa no Techo".

Track listing 

 Here Alone
 Song for love
 I Saw Mommy Kissing Santa Claus
 Here Alone(Instrumental)
 Song for love(Instrumental)

Charts
Oricon Sales Chart (Japan)

References

Beni (singer) songs
2004 singles
2004 songs
Avex Trax singles